The Battle of Haram or Chramon (modern Nova Palanka) was fought between the forces of King Stephen II (r. 1116–1131) of Hungary and Emperor John II Komnenos (r. 1118–1143) of the Byzantine Empire in the year 1128, or possibly earlier – in 1125 (the chronology is uncertain), in what is now Serbia, and resulted in a major defeat for the Hungarians.

Background
John II was married to the Hungarian princess Piroska, and this involved him in the dynastic struggles of the Kingdom of Hungary. In giving asylum to Álmos, a blinded claimant to the Hungarian throne, John aroused the suspicions of King Stephen II of Hungary. John refused a demand from Stephen that Álmos be surrendered to him. The Hungarians, led by the king, then crossed the Danube frontier and invaded Byzantium's Balkan provinces. Most authorities place this event in 1127, with hostilities lasting until 1129; however, an alternative chronology has been suggested with the Hungarian attack and Byzantine retaliation taking place in 1125 with a renewal of hostilities in 1126. The Hungarians attacked Belgrade, Niš, and Sofia; John, who was near Philippopolis in Thrace, counterattacked, supported by a naval flotilla operating on the River Danube.

Battle

After a challenging campaign, the details of which are obscure, John II managed to defeat the Hungarians and their Serbian allies at the fortress of Haram or Chramon, located in modern Nova Palanka, on the Hungarian bank of the Danube. The Hungarian army, under a commander named Setephel as King Stephen was ill, had entrenched itself, defending the line of the Danube. 

The Hungarian Chronicle indicates that the Byzantines gained naval control of the river; it says that the 'Greeks' had set the Hungarian ships "alight with sulphurous fires", indicating the use of the incendiary weapon, 'Greek fire'. The Byzantine historian John Cinnamus describes John II employing a ruse to allow his army to cross the river. He sent a mercenary force composed of "Ligurian knights" (Lombards) and Turks (probably horse archers) to threaten a crossing upstream, while he stayed on the shore opposite Haram with the rest of his army. The ruse worked as his army crossed the river at Haram by boat, the emperor himself on board the imperial trireme. An opposed river crossing is one of the most demanding of military operations. The Byzantine army must have been very disciplined and well supported by archers and bolt-firing artillery on the imperial ships. 

Once on the Hungarian bank of the Danube the Byzantine cavalry then, "with couched lances, scattered the assembled Hungarian forces." Many Hungarian troops were killed when a bridge they were crossing collapsed as they were fleeing from the Byzantine attack. The Byzantines took Haram, and other Hungarian fortified settlements in the area, and collected a great deal of plunder. The action has been described as a "bloody battle" and a great defeat for the Hungarians. 

The Hungarian Chronicle says of the battle: "The hand of God was with the Greeks and the Hungarians could not resist them. The slaughter that took place was so great that its like has rarely been seen. The river Karas was so infused with human blood that it appeared to flow with gore alone. The warriors began to throw corpses into the river and fled across them, crossing the river as if by a bridge. However, more Hungarians were slaughtered like cattle, for nothing could save them from the Greeks".

Aftermath
Following his victory over the Hungarians John II launched a punitive raid against the Serbs. Dangerously for the Byzantines the Serbs had aligned themselves with Hungary. Many Serbian prisoners were taken, and these were transported to Nicomedia in Asia Minor to serve as military colonists. This was done partly to cow the Serbs into submission (Serbia was, at least nominally, a Byzantine protectorate), and partly to strengthen the Byzantine frontier in the east against the Turks. The Serbs were forced to acknowledge Byzantine suzerainty once again.

In Hungary, the defeat at Haram undermined Stephen II's authority and he faced a serious revolt when two counts, named 'Bors' (possibly Boris Kalamanos) and 'Ivan', were declared kings. Both were eventually defeated, Ivan being beheaded and Bors fleeing to Byzantium.

Following this, the Hungarians renewed hostilities, possibly in order that King Stephen could be seen to reassert his authority, by attacking the Byzantine frontier fortress of Braničevo, which was immediately rebuilt by John. Further Byzantine military successes – Choniates mentions several engagements – resulted in a restoration of peace. Cinnamus describes a Byzantine reverse occurring before peace was established, which suggests that the campaign was not entirely one-sided. Hungarian records, however, agree with Choniates in indicating that King Stephen was again defeated and was consequently forced to negotiate a peace on Byzantine terms. The Byzantines were confirmed in their control of Braničevo, Belgrade, and Zemun and they also recovered the region of Sirmium (called Frangochorion in Choniates), which had been Hungarian since the 1060s. The Hungarian pretender Álmos died in 1129, removing the major source of friction.

See also
Komnenian Byzantine army

References

Sources

Primary

Secondary

Lau, M.C.G. (2016) The Naval Reform of Emperor JohnII Komnenos: a Re-evaluation, Mediterranean Historical Review, 31:2, 115-138, DOI:10.1080/09518967.2016.1248641, https://doi.org/10.1080/09518967.2016.1248641

Stephenson, Paul (2000) Byzantium's Balkan Frontier: A Political Study of the Northern Balkans, 900-1204, Cambridge University Press. 

Battles involving the Byzantine Empire
Komnenos dynasty
12th century in Serbia
Battles involving Hungary in the Middle Ages
Battles involving Serbia in the Middle Ages
History of Banat
Medieval history of Vojvodina
Haram
1128 in Europe
1120s in the Byzantine Empire
Grand Principality of Serbia
John II Komnenos